In the 1995–96 season Panathinaikos played for 37th consecutive time in Greece's top division, the Alpha Ethniki. They also competed in the Champions League and Greek Cup.

Squad

Competitions

Alpha Ethniki

Classification

UEFA Champions League

Qualifying round

Group A

Knockout stage

Quarter-finals

Semi-finals

Greek Super Cup
The 1996 Greek Super Cup was played at the Karaiskakis Stadium.

Team kit

References

External links
 Panathinaikos FC official website

Panathinaikos F.C. seasons
Panathinaikos
Greek football championship-winning seasons